Camillo Pacetti (Rome, 2 May 1758 - Milan, 16 July 1826) was an Italian sculptor.  He was the brother of Vincenzo Pacetti, another sculptor.

A student of the Accademia di San Luca, he later worked in various churches in Rome and Milan.  In 1804, on Antonio Canova's recommendation, he was offered the role of chair of the Accademia di Belle Arti di Brera in Milan, to succeed Giuseppe Franchi.  Besides this teaching engagement, Pacetti accepted also public commissions, such as the statue of the New Law for the facade of the Duomo and reliefs for the Arco della Pace at Milan (the arch planned by Luigi Cagnola and also featuring sculpture by Luigi Canonica).  His subject matter ranged from portraits to mythological and allegorical scenes.

He was engaged by Josiah Wedgwood in Rome from 1787/88 under the supervision of John Flaxman, to model six tablets illustrating the life of Achilles. A pen and wash drawing by Pacetti of Achilles on the back of Centaur hunting a Lion is in the Wedgwood Museum, Barlaston - it is copied  from a similar image on a classical marble, the Luna Disc of c. 800-400 BC in the Capitoline Museum, substituting that work's female centaur for Chiron. He completed a Minerva for the Brera.

References

18th-century Italian sculptors
Italian male sculptors
19th-century Italian sculptors
1758 births
1826 deaths
Academic staff of Brera Academy
19th-century Italian male artists
18th-century Italian male artists